Hypopyra ochracea is a moth of the family Erebidae. It is found in Indo China.

References

Moths described in 1927
Hypopyra